A barebone computer is a partially assembled platform or an unassembled kit of computer parts allowing more customization and lower costs than a retail computer system. They are available for desktop computer, notebook (see  barebook) and server purposes, and in nearly any form factor. Manufacturers are also able to produce systems of a specialized or non-standard form factor, since the system is sold as a pre-built unit, with the motherboard and power supply already installed.

Components
Assembling a barebone computer by hand is usually less expensive than buying a pre-configured computer from a retailer, and may save time and labor compared with building a system from scratch. A typical barebone desktop system consists of a CPU, a computer case (or tower), with a pre-fitted motherboard and power supply. If not already provided, the purchaser of such a platform only has to equip it with a RAM, and optionally a hard drive (in some cases, an operating system is/can be installed to a lower-cost flash drive instead). Additional input/output devices may be required depending on their needs. Sometimes, it is necessary to install an operating system if the one built into the motherboard is deemed insufficient (or not present at all). An audio adapter or network adapter may be added but this is less common as recent motherboards often already contain capable solutions.

Peripherals, such as a keyboard, mouse and monitor, almost always must be acquired separately. Barebone systems sometimes include a graphics processor or RAM, but rarely any mass storage media (hard drives), operating system or other software.  Sometimes PCs with everything a normal desktop PC has except Microsoft Windows operating systems are sold as a barebone computer, but may include free software such as Linux. Refurbished and used computers may also be repackaged as barebone computers, as many computers returned for refurbishing may have missing, broken, or obsolete parts such as hard drives and peripherals.

Upgrade limitations
Future upgradeability of a barebone system may be limited, especially the motherboard component, which may have less space for extra I/O devices and fewer memory and PCI card slots than desired. The motherboard may not be compatible with faster processors and memory than those originally purchased with the barebone system. Barebones may also have limit on the maximal processor thermal design power (TDP) and not be able to support CPUs that would otherwise fit into the socket.

Manufacturers
The following companies currently manufacture barebone computers:
 Acer Inc.
Advantech
 ASUSTeK Computer Inc.
 Biostar
 Gigabyte Technology Co. Ltd.
 Intel
 Micro-Star International (MSI)
 Shuttle Inc.
 Supermicro (servers)
 Systemax/Tiger Direct
 ZOTAC

See also

 Barebook
 Bare machine
 Computer case
 Computer
 Small form factor
 Shuttle Inc.
 Supermicro (servers)
 Tyan (servers)

References

External links
 AMD-based small form factor barebone systems which have been tested by AMD's validation labs

Classes of computers